Lomanotidae is a family of sea slugs, marine gastropod mollusks in the superfamily Tritonioidea.

The family Lomanotidae has no subfamilies.

Genera 
Genera within the family Lomanotidae include:
 Lomanotus Verany, 1844 - type genus

References

 Thompson, T. E., &  Brown, G.H., 1984. Biology of opisthobranch Molluscs. Vol. 2. Ray Society; London. 1-229, p.17

External links